S. Abdul Rahim is an Indian politician who was a member of the 14th Tamil Nadu Legislative Assembly. He represented All India Anna Dravida Munnetra Kazhagam party from Avadi constituency.

He held office as Minister for Backward Classes & Minority Welfare.

The elections of 2016 resulted in his constituency being won by K. Pandiarajan.

Political life 
Rahim joined All India Anna Dravida Munnetra Kazhagam at the age of 18 and he served twice as deputy chairman of Avadi municipality.

References 

Tamil Nadu MLAs 2011–2016
All India Anna Dravida Munnetra Kazhagam politicians
Living people
People from Avadi
Year of birth missing (living people)
Place of birth missing (living people)
Tamil Nadu politicians